Fitzroy Brown (born 3 April 1959) is a Guyanese boxer. He competed in the men's featherweight event at the 1980 Summer Olympics. At the 1980 Summer Olympics, he defeated Abílio Cabral of Angola, before losing to Luis Pizarro of Puerto Rico. Brown also represented Guyana at the 1983 Pan American Games.

References

1959 births
Living people
Guyanese male boxers
Olympic boxers of Guyana
Boxers at the 1980 Summer Olympics
Pan American Games competitors for Guyana
Boxers at the 1983 Pan American Games
Place of birth missing (living people)
Featherweight boxers